Diplomaniacs is a 1933 American pre-Code comedy film starring Wheeler and Woolsey. The film in noted for its absurdist political satire, somewhat in the manner of Million Dollar Legs or Duck Soup, both of which were released within a year of Diplomaniacs.

Plot
The film concerns the adventures of two men who have set up a failing business as barbers on an Indian reservation. When they are sent by the tribe as representatives to a peace conference in Europe, unbeknownst to them, they face constant threats from other attendees. In particular, several armaments manufacturers want to ensure that the peace conference is a failure, and do everything they can to sabotage it.

Cast
 Bert Wheeler as Willy Nilly
 Robert Woolsey as Hercules Glub
 Marjorie White as Dolores
 Phyllis Barry as Fifi
 Louis Calhern as Winklereid
 Hugh Herbert as Chow-Chow, the China Man
 Edgar Kennedy as Chairman of the Peace Conference
 Richard Carle as Ship's Captain
 William Irving as Schmerzenpuppen
 Neely Edwards as Puppenschmerzen
 Billy Bletcher as Schmerzenschmerzen
 Ted Hart as Puppenpuppen
 Edward Cooper as Indian Chief

Box office
According to RKO records, the film made a profit of $65,000.

References

External links

Diplomaniacs at IMDb

1933 films
1933 comedy films
American comedy films
Films with screenplays by Joseph L. Mankiewicz
Films scored by Max Steiner
Films scored by Roy Webb
American black-and-white films
RKO Pictures films
Films directed by William A. Seiter
1930s American films